Ahmed Fawzi (born 26 November 2001) is an Emirati footballer who currently plays as a forward for Al Jazira.

Career statistics

Club

Notes

References

2001 births
Living people
Emirati footballers
Association football forwards
UAE Pro League players
Al Jazira Club players